The Facial Recognition Technology (FERET) database is a dataset used for facial recognition system evaluation as part of the Face Recognition Technology (FERET) program. It was first established in 1993 under a collaborative effort between Dr. Harry Wechsler at George Mason University and Dr. Jonathan Phillips at the Army Research Laboratory in Adelphi, Maryland. The FERET database serves as a standard database of facial images for researchers to use to develop various algorithms and report results. The use of a common database also allowed one to compare the effectiveness of different approaches in methodology and gauge their strengths and weaknesses.

The facial images for the database were collected between December 1993 and August 1996, accumulating a total of 14,126 images pertaining to 1199 individuals along with 365 duplicate sets of images that were taken on a different day. In 2003, the Defense Advanced Research Projects Agency (DARPA) released a high-resolution, 24-bit color version of these images. The dataset tested includes 2,413 still facial images, representing 856 individuals. The FERET database has been used by more than 460 research groups and is managed by the National Institute of Standards and Technology (NIST).

References

External links
 Official website about the gray-scale version
 Official website about the color version
 More official information
 IEEE Transactions on Pattern Analysis and Machine Intelligence, VOL. 22, NO. 10, October 2000
More documents about FERET

Biometric databases
Datasets in computer vision
Face recognition
Scientific databases
Test items
Machine learning task
Automatic identification and data capture
Surveillance